Frank Gambale (born 22 December 1958) is an Australian jazz fusion guitarist. He has released twenty albums over a period of three decades, and is known for his use of the sweep picking and economy picking techniques.

Recording career

Solo albums
Gambale graduated from the Guitar Institute of Technology in Hollywood with Student of the Year honors and taught there from 1984 to 1986.

Groups
With the Mark Varney Project, consisting of Allan Holdsworth, Brett Garsed, and Shawn Lane, he recorded two albums, Truth in Shredding (1990) and Centrifugal Funk (1991).

Beginning in 1987, he spent six years as a member of the Chick Corea Elektric Band, playing with Eric Marienthal, John Patitucci, and Dave Weckl. With Corea's band he recorded five albums and shared two Grammy Award nominations. He spent twelve years as a member of Vital Information, led by Steve Smith. He reunited with the Elektric Band in 2002 and with Corea in 2011 when he joined Return to Forever IV with Stanley Clarke, Jean-Luc Ponty, and Lenny White.

Teaching
Gambale has been head of the guitar department at the Los Angeles Music Academy. He joined the Isina mentorship program as head of the guitar department in 2014. During the next year, he started an online guitar school.

Technique
Gambale has become identified with sweep picking and economy picking. His interest grew out of a desire to transcend the physical limits of the guitar and borrow from other instruments, such as the piano and saxophone. One advantage of the technique is that it allows him to play faster. He can also approximate the way chords are played on piano by using his invented tuning, the Gambale Tuning, in which "the whole guitar is tuned up a fourth, but the top two strings are down an octave" (A, D, G, C, E, A, low to high).

To further explain the exact strings and tuning used in the Gambale Tuning, Frank posted this explanation on his Facebook page, June 10, 2019

"So, here is GAMBALE TUNING explained...and it only took me 40 years to invent this! ADGCEA. It's the same relative tuning as regular guitar but the lowest string is the 5th string A instead of the regular low E. Also, the 1st and 2nd strings are one octave lower. Here's the suggested string gauges. From low to high use strings from an electric 10 gauge standard set. Use only the A D G and B strings for the 6th, 5th, 4th and 3rd strings. The B string will be tuned up a half step to C. Then for the 1st and 2nd strings use a D and a G string from a standard 09 gauge set. These two strings are to be tuned up a whole step so the D will be tuned to E as the 2nd string wound, and the G will be tuned to A as the 1st string."

Influence
Gambale has been featured on the covers of many guitar and jazz-oriented magazines worldwide, while having been cited as an influence by many notable guitarists including Synyster Gates, Dweezil Zappa, Greg Howe, and Pat Metheny. In a 1991 interview with Rolling Stone magazine, guitarist Jerry Garcia stated that Gambale was one of his favorite players at the time, stating, "My personal favorite lately is this guy Frank Gambale, who's been playing with Chick Corea for the past couple of years."

Discography

As leader
 1986 Brave New Guitar (Legato)
 1987 A Present for the Future (Legato)
 1989 Live! (Legato)
 1990 Thunder from Down Under (JVC)
 1991 Note Worker (JVC)
 1993 The Great Explorers (JVC)
 1994 Passages (JVC)
 1995 Thinking Out Loud (JVC)
 2000 Coming to Your Senses (Favored Nations)
 2004 Raison D'être (ESC)
 2004 Resident Alien - Live Bootlegs (Wombat)
 2004 Resident Alien - Live Bootlegs Disc Two (Wombat)
 2006 Natural High (Wombat)
 2010 Natural Selection  (Wombat)
2012 Frank Gambale Soulmine feat. Boca (Wombat)
2018 Salve

As co-leader/band member
With Vital Information
1988 Fiafiaga
1991 Vital Live
1992 Easier Done Than Said
1996 Ray of Hope
1998 Where We Come From
2000 Live Around the World
2000 Live from Mars
2002 Show 'em Where You Live
2004 Come on In
2012 Live! One Great Night

With Chick Corea Elektric Band
1987 Light Years
1988 Eye of the Beholder
1990 Inside Out
1991 Beneath the Mask
1996 The Songs of West Side Story
2004 To the Stars
2004 Chick Corea Elektric Band – Live at Montreux (DVD)

With GHS (Gambale/Hamm/Smith)
1998 Show Me What You Can Do
2000 The Light Beyond
2002 GHS 3

With MVP (The Mark Varney Project)
1990 Truth in Shredding (with Allan Holdsworth)
1991 Centrifugal Funk (with Shawn Lane and Brett Garsed)

With Donati & Fierabracci
2007 Made In Australia

With Maurizio Colonna
2000 Imagery Suite (also known as Playgame)
2005 Live
2007 Bon Voyage

With Maurizo Vercon
2008 For You Featuring Frank Gambale

With GRP Super Live
1988 GRP Super Live – in Concert

With School of the Arts featuring T Lavitz
 School of the Arts (Magnatude, 2007)

As featured artist
 2023 Markus Venehsalo & Mavon Safia: Projekt 13 (feat. Frank Gambale) (Eclipse Music)

Instructional videos
1988: Monster Licks & Speed Picking
1991: Modes: No More Mystery
1993: Chopbuilder: The Ultimate Guitar Workout
2003: Concert with Class
2007: Acoustic Improvisation

Instructional books
1985: Speed Picking (REH)
1994: The Frank Gambale Technique Book I
1994: The Frank Gambale Technique Book II
1997: Improvisation Made Easier
1997: The Best of Frank Gambale

References

External links
Official website
Frank Gambale's Magic Chords

1958 births
Australian jazz guitarists
Australian people of Italian descent
Jazz fusion guitarists
Jazz-rock guitarists
Living people
Lead guitarists
Musicians Institute alumni
Vital Information members
Chick Corea Elektric Band members
Favored Nations artists